Animal World was a wildlife television series that aired from June 1968 to September 1971, hosted by Bill Burrud. The series debuted on 16 June 1968 under the name Animal Kingdom, and was renamed Animal World beginning with the 11 August 1968 broadcast.

1968 Season Animal Kingdom

1969 season

1971 season

References

External links
 TV Times Animal World and its Host

Animal World